Mordellistena peloponnesensis is a species of beetle in the genus Mordellistena of the family Mordellidae. It was described by Batten in 1980 and can be found on the islands such as Crete and Cyprus, Mediterranean part of Greece and Near East.

References

Beetles described in 1980
peloponnesensis
Beetles of Europe